Sunrise Radio is an Asian radio station in Bradford, West Yorkshire, in the United Kingdom.

Availability
The station broadcasts 24 hours a day on 103.2 FM across Bradford & surrounding areas and on DAB Calderdale, Kirklees and Bradford (which includes Bradford, Huddersfield, Keighley) and Manchester. A feed is also available worldwide via the station's website. The station is also the first Asian radio station to link up with another station in another country; it partners with Sunrise FM in Pakistan to broadcast a daily show there.

Broadcasting mainly to the region's ethnic minority communities, Bradford City Radio Ltd, trading as SUNRISE RADIO (Yorkshire) was formally launched on 9 December 1989.
 103.2 FM – Bradford and surrounding areas
 Digital Radio – West Yorkshire, Manchester 
 Online – via Sunrise FM website and other external radio sites
 Mobile / Tablet – via Sunrise Radio FM smartphone app and other radio apps.
 TV – via Apple TV

Format
Sunrise Radio works closely with local charities and voluntary groups and provides regular "what's on" information. The station also has regular news bulletins through the day and has "News in-focus" at 5 pm, a 15-minute in-depth report.
The music policy consists of "Bollywood", "Lollywood", "Bhangra", "Asian Pop", "Qawalis" and "Ghazals".

Background
The station was launched (as Bradford City Radio) in December 1989 and is the first and only commercial Asian radio station on FM in the UK.

The studios are based in Bradford City Centre and the mix of programming aims to take into account the area's diverse population, something that no other radio station in the region has previously attempted.

Sunrise Radio was named "Ethnic Media of the Year" in both 2001 and 2002 and was awarded title "Media of the Year" in 2004.

Usha Parmar is the Chief Executive.
Raj Parmar is Events and marketing director. He also runs Spice Entertainment.

Recognitions
 Sunrise Radio, a finalist in the "Best in Creative Industries" category at the British Indian Awards
 Sunrise Radio – Winner of "Regional Radio Station of the Year" Award at Asian Media Awards, 2016
 Sunrise Radio – Winner of the "Best Asian Music Radio Station – Northern UK" by LUX entertainment awards
 Sunrise Radio – Best Asian Hit Music Station 2020 – England – Corporate Vision Media Innovator Awards

References

 http://sunriseradio.fm/info/how-to-listen/
 http://www.sunriseradio.fm/info/about-sunrise-radio/

External links
 

Mass media in Bradford
Radio stations in Yorkshire
Asian mass media in the United Kingdom
British Indian mass media